Wilfried Telkämper (born 16 January 1953, in Lingen-Ems, Germany.), became the new Director at the Centre for International Dialogue and Cooperation of Rosa Luxemburg Foundation on 1 July 2010.

References

External links 
 Your MEPs

1953 births
People from Lingen
Living people
Alliance 90/The Greens MEPs
MEPs for Germany 1984–1989
MEPs for Germany 1989–1994
MEPs for Germany 1994–1999